Kareem Martin (born February 19, 1992) is a former American football defensive end. He was drafted by the Arizona Cardinals in the third round of the 2014 NFL Draft. He played college football at North Carolina. He had also played for the New York Giants.

High school
A native of Roanoke Rapids, North Carolina, he attended Roanoke Rapids High School, where he was a letterman in football, basketball and track. In football, Martin was twice named the area defensive player of the year and was named the NCHSAA Athlete of the Year. As a senior, he helped lead Roanoke Rapids to an undefeated season and a conference title. He finished his senior season with 163 tackles, 10 forced fumbles, three fumble recoveries, four sacks and one interception, and also had 25 tackles for a loss. He had 121 tackles and five sacks as a junior.

In track & field, Martin was one of the state's top performers in the jumping and hurdling events. He qualified for the state finals in the high jump by leaping 6 ft 6 in (1.99 m) at the 2010 NCHSAA 2A Mideast Regional. In addition, he also took 5th in the 110-meter hurdles event in that same meet, recording a personal-best time of 15.84 second. At the NCHSAA 2A State Track Championship, he tied for 2nd place in the high jump, with a leap of 6 ft 6 in (1.98 m).

Considered a three-star recruit by Rivals.com, he was rated the 28th best weakside defensive end in the nation. Martin accepted a scholarship offer from North Carolina over offers from Duke and Virginia Tech and majored in Public Policy.

College career

As a true freshman in 2010, Martin played in 11 games, starting the first three games against LSU, Georgia Tech and Rutgers. He capped off his season with 16 tackles, including 1.5 for loss, one pass breakup and two quarterback pressures. In 2011, he started all 13 games at defensive end. He finished the regular season with 40 tackles, seven tackles for losses, four sacks, one fumble recovery, six pass breakups and five quarterback hurries. In 2011, he started all 12 games and earned second-team All-ACC honors. He totaled 40 tackles, including 15.5 for loss, four sacks, eight quarterback hurries and three pass breakups. He also forced one fumble and recovered another. As a senior, he earned first-team All-ACC honors after finishing his season best for third on the team with 82 tackles, 21.5 tackles for loss, 11.5 sacks, 14 quarterback hurries, three forced fumbles and two fumble recoveries.

Professional career

Arizona Cardinals
Martin was drafted by the Arizona Cardinals in the third round (84th overall) of the 2014 NFL Draft.

New York Giants
On March 15, 2018, Martin signed a three-year, $21 million contract with the New York Giants with $7.5 million guaranteed.

On September 11, 2019, Martin was placed on injured reserve after suffering a knee injury in week one against the Dallas Cowboys. He was designated for return from injured reserve on November 27, 2019, and began practicing with the team again. He was activated on December 7, 2019.

On February 26, 2020, Martin was released from the Giants.

Detroit Lions
On September 15, 2020, Martin was signed to the Detroit Lions practice squad. He was elevated to the active roster on December 12 and December 19 for the team's weeks 14 and 15 games against the Green Bay Packers and Tennessee Titans, and reverted to the practice squad after each game. His contract expired when the teams season ended January 3, 2021.

References

External links
North Carolina Tar Heels bio

1992 births
Living people
American football defensive ends
Arizona Cardinals players
Detroit Lions players
New York Giants players
North Carolina Tar Heels football players
People from Roanoke Rapids, North Carolina
Players of American football from North Carolina